Pavonia is a genus of flowering plants in the mallow family, Malvaceae. The generic name honours Spanish botanist José Antonio Pavón Jiménez (1754–1844), as chosen by his contemporary, Spanish botanist Antonio José Cavanilles. Several species are known as swampmallows.

Species

Hybrids
Pavonia × gledhillii Cheek, 1989 (Pavonia makoyana × Pavonia multiflora)

Gallery

References

 Fryxell, P.A. (2009). A new species of Pavonia (Malvaceae) from the Atlantic coastal forests of eastern Brazil. Phytotaxa 2: 13–18.

Hibisceae
Malvaceae genera
Taxa named by Antonio José Cavanilles